The  is an art gallery in Rome, Italy, housed in the former Villa Borghese Pinciana. At the outset, the gallery building was integrated with its gardens, but nowadays the Villa Borghese gardens are considered a separate tourist attraction. The Galleria Borghese houses a substantial part of the Borghese Collection of paintings, sculpture and antiquities, begun by Cardinal Scipione Borghese, the nephew of Pope Paul V (reign 1605–1621). The building was constructed by the architect Flaminio Ponzio, developing sketches by Scipione Borghese himself, who used it as a villa suburbana, a country villa at the edge of Rome.

Scipione Borghese was an early patron of Bernini and an avid collector of works by Caravaggio, who is well represented in the collection by his Boy with a Basket of Fruit, St Jerome Writing, Sick Bacchus and others. Additional paintings of note include Titian's Sacred and Profane Love, Raphael's Entombment of Christ and works by Peter Paul Rubens and Federico Barocci.

History
The Casino Borghese was erected in an area that in the seventeenth-century was outside of the walls of Rome, with the closest access being the Porta del Popolo. At the origins, the villa grounds covered an area with a circumference of nearly 3 miles. The main building was designed by the Flemish architect Giovanni Vasanzio. The portico had spolia derived from the Arch of Claudius, once on the Via Flaminia.

By 1644, John Evelyn described it as "an Elysium of delight" with "Fountains of sundry inventions, Groves and small Rivulets of Water". Evelyn also described the Vivarium that housed ostriches, peacocks, swans and cranes "and divers strange Beasts".  Prince Marcantonio IV Borghese (1730–1800), who began the recasting of the park's formal garden architecture into an English landscape garden, also set out about 1775, under the guidance of the architect Antonio Asprucci, to replace the now-outdated tapestry and leather hangings and renovate the Casina, restaging the Borghese sculptures and antiquities in a thematic new ordering that celebrated the Borghese position in Rome. The rehabilitation of the much-visited villa as a genuinely public museum in the late eighteenth century was the subject of an exhibition at the Getty Research Institute, Los Angeles, in 2000, spurred by the Getty's acquisition of fifty-four drawings related to the project.

In 1808, Prince Camillo Borghese, Napoleon's brother-in-law, was forced to sell the Borghese Roman sculptures and antiquities to the Emperor. The result is that the Borghese Gladiator, renowned since the 1620s as the most admired single sculpture in Villa Borghese, must now be appreciated in the Musée du Louvre. The "Borghese Hermaphroditus" is also now in the Louvre.

The Borghese villa was modified and extended down the years, eventually being sold to the Italian government in 1902, along with the entire Borghese estate and surrounding gardens and parkland.

Collection

The Galleria Borghese includes twenty rooms across two floors.

The main floor is mostly devoted to classical antiquities of the 1st–3rd centuries AD (including a famous 320–30 AD mosaic of gladiators found on the Borghese estate at Torrenova, on the Via Casilina outside Rome, in 1834), and classical and neo-classical sculpture such as the Venus Victrix.

The main floor's main large room, called the Salone, has a large trompe-l'œil ceiling fresco in the first room by the Sicilian artist Mariano Rossi makes such good use of foreshortening that it appears almost three-dimensional. The fresco depicts Marcus Furius Camillus relieving the siege of the Capitoline Hill by the Gauls. The grotteschi decorations were painted by Pietro Rotari, and the animal decorations by Venceslaus Peter Boemo.

The first room off the Salone, is the Camera di Cerere, with marble vase depicting Oedipus and the Sphinx. The second room has a ceiling frescoed by Francesco Caccianiga with the Fall of Phaeton. The third room houses Bernini's Apollo and Daphne.

Gian Lorenzo Bernini at the Borghese
Many of the sculptures are displayed in the spaces for which they were intended, including many works by Gian Lorenzo Bernini, which comprise a significant percentage of his output of secular sculpture, starting with early works such as the Goat Amalthea with Infant Jupiter and Faun (1615) and Aeneas, Anchises & Ascanius (1618–19)  to his dynamic Rape of Proserpine (1621–22),  Apollo and Daphne (1622–25)  and David (1623)  which are considered seminal works of baroque sculpture. In addition, several portrait busts are included in the gallery, including one of Pope Paul V, and two portraits of one of his early patrons, Cardinal Scipione Borghese (1632). The second Scipione Borghese portrait was produced after a large crack was discovered in the marble of the first version during its creation.

Nearby museums
Also in Villa Borghese gardens or nearby are the Galleria Nazionale d'Arte Moderna, which specialises in 19th- and 20th-century Italian art, and Museo Nazionale Etrusco, a collection of pre-Roman objects, mostly Etruscan, excavated around Rome.

Gallery

Sculptures

Paintings

Notes

External links
 Official website
 Amor sacro e amor profano (Sacred and Profane Love) Description of the painting.
 Architecture and gardens on the Villa Borghese or Casino
 Reviews of Galleria Borghese
  Satellite photo — the Galleria Borghese is the villa in the center of the photograph surrounded by landscaped gardens.
 Roman Map of the area with related services
 
 

 
Houses completed in the 17th century
Art museums and galleries in Rome
Borghese, Villa
Art museums established in 1903
1903 establishments in Italy
Rome Q. III Pinciano